Tomasz Robert Gollob (born 11 April 1971 in Bydgoszcz, Poland) is a former Polish motorcycle speedway rider. He appeared in every Speedway Grand Prix series between its inaugural season in 1995 and 2013. His brother Jacek is also a speedway rider.

Career summary

Tomasz Gollob spent almost all of his career with hometown club Bydgoszcz until he moved to Unia Tarnów in 2004. He has won the Polish Individual Championship eight times (between 1992 and 2009) and the Polish Pairs Championship ten times. He has also won the Polish Grand Prix eight times in thirteen years. He clinched the Speedway World Championship in 2010 after securing the championship in Terenzano, Italy. He is only the second Pole to ever win the World Championship, following in the footsteps of Jerzy Szczakiel who won in 1973.

Gollob also spent some time in Australia in the early-mid 1990s based at the North Arm Speedway in Adelaide. While In Australia, Gollob would race against many of his future World Championship rivals including Jason Crump, Leigh Adams, and Ryan Sullivan. Gollob is the only World Champion to win the Jack Young Solo Cup held in Adelaide each year in memory of Australia's 1951 and 1952 World Champion, Jack Young. He won the cup in 1995 at North Arm.

On 28 July 1996 he won the Continental Final, which formed part of the 1997 Speedway Grand Prix Qualification.

Gollob was also a member of the Poland speedway team that won the World Team Cup in 1996 and the World Cup in 2005, 2007, 2009, 2010, 2011.

In 2007 Gollob survived a plane crash with fellow rider Rune Holta. The plane, flown by his father Władysław, crashed on the way to a speedway meeting at Tarnów. Gollob escaped with cuts and bruises after pulling his father from the wreckage.

In 2017 Gollob suffered serious injuries to head and spine in a motocross accident during a MX event in Northern Poland.
 
For his sport achievements, he received the Order of Polonia Restituta: 

  Knight's Cross (5th Class) in 2000
  Officer's Cross (4th Class) in 2007
  Commander's Cross (2010)

World final appearances

Individual World Championship
 1993 -  Pocking, Rottalstadion  - 7th - 8pts
 1994 -  Vojens, Speedway Center - 16th - 0pts

World Pairs Championship
 1993 -  Vojens, Speedway Center (with Piotr Świst / Piotr Baron) - 5th - 15pts (15)

World Team Cup
 1994 -  Brokstedt, Holsteinring Brokstedt - 2nd - 20pts (16)
 1995 -  Bydgoszcz, Polonia Bydgoszcz Stadium - 6th - 13pts (12)
 1996 -  Diedenbergen, Hofheim-Diedenbergen - Winner - 27pts (15)
 1997 -  Piła, Stadion Żużlowy Centrum - 2nd - 25pts (13)
 1998 -  Vojens, Speedway Center - 4th - 17pts (15)

World Cup
 2001 -  Wrocław, Olympic Stadium - 2nd - 65pts (27)
 2002 -  Peterborough, East of England Showground - 4th - 48pts (17)
 2003 -  Vojens, Speedway Center - 4th - 49pts (20)
 2004 -  Poole, Poole Stadium - 4th - 22pts (1)
 2005 -  Wrocław, Olympic Stadium - Winner - 62pts
 2007 -  Leszno, Alfred Smoczyk Stadium - Winner - 55pts
 2008 -  Vojens, Speedway Center  - 2nd - 46pts
 2009 -  Leszno, Alfred Smoczyk Stadium - Winner - 44pts
 2010 -  Vojens, Speedway Center  - Winner - 46pts

Individual Under-21 World Championship
 1992 -  Pfaffenhofen an der Ilm, Speedway Stadion Pfaffenhofen - 5th - 10pts

Speedway Grand Prix results

Family
Tomasz Gollob has two brothers and one sister

See also
 Poland national speedway team
 List of Speedway Grand Prix riders
 Speedway in Poland

References

External links

1971 births
Living people
Polish speedway riders
Individual Speedway World Champions
Speedway World Cup champions
Polish speedway champions
Sportspeople from Bydgoszcz
Polonia Bydgoszcz riders
Ipswich Witches riders
Commanders of the Order of Polonia Restituta